A Tom and Jerry is a traditional Christmastime cocktail in the United States, sometimes attributed to British writer and professional boxing journalist Pierce Egan in the 1820s. It is a variant of eggnog with brandy and rum added and served hot, usually in a mug or a bowl.

Another method uses egg whites, beaten stiff, with the yolks and sugar folded back in, and optionally vanilla extract added. A few spoonfuls are added to a mug, then hot milk and rum are added, and it is topped with nutmeg. Pre-made Tom and Jerry batter, typically produced by manufacturers in Wisconsin, Minnesota and the Dakotas, is sold in regional supermarkets during the Christmas season.

Name
The drink's name is a reference to Egan's book, Life in London, or The Day and Night Scenes of Jerry Hawthorn Esq. and his Elegant Friend Corinthian Tom (1821), and the subsequent stage play Tom and Jerry, or Life in London (also 1821). To publicize the book and the play, Egan introduced a variation of eggnog by adding  of brandy, calling it a "Tom and Jerry". The additional fortification helped popularize the drink.

In popular culture
Tom and Jerry was a favorite of President Warren G. Harding, who served it at an annual Christmas party for his closest friends.

Two much later cartoon duos, a short-lived Tom and Jerry from Van Beuren Studios in the 1930s, and the famous cat and mouse rivalry from the 1940s through the 1960s, also bore the name, possibly as a play on words with the drink or the literary works that inspired it.

The Tom and Jerry serves as the main device in the story "I Yust Go Nuts at Christmas" by Yogi Yorgesson, in which Yogi drinks a dozen rounds of the beverage and is thus hung over for the following day's Christmas dinner.

See also
List of cocktails

References

External links

American alcoholic drinks
Christmas food
Cocktails with brandy
Cocktails with rum
English alcoholic drinks
Hot drinks
Milk-based drinks
Mixed drinks
Cocktails with eggs